Roger Potter (October 5, 1907 – June 1982) was an American basketball coach, who was the first coach for the National Basketball Association's Tri-Cities Blackhawks (now the Atlanta Hawks).  He lasted seven games (going 1-6) and was replaced with Red Auerbach.

References

External links
 BasketballReference.com:  Roger Potter

1907 births
1982 deaths
Tri-Cities Blackhawks head coaches